Srishti Jain is an Indian television actress known for portraying  various roles including Durga in Star Plus's Meri Durga and Jaya Sharma opposite Namish Taneja in Sony TV's Main Mayke Chali Jaungi.

Early life
Jain was born in Bhopal, Madhya Pradesh.

Career
Jain starred as a child actor in War Chhod Na Yaar. She began TV career in 2016 with Suhani Si Ek Ladki as Krishna Mathur.

Next, she played Durga Chaudhary in Meri Durga opposite Paras Kalnawat.

From 2018 to 2019, Jain portrayed Jaya Sharma in Main Mayke Chali Jaungi.

Just after its end she was cast for Star Bharat's Ek Thi Rani Ek Tha Raavan as Mayura and then an episode of &TV's Laal Ishq as Yami.

She next starred in Zee TV's Hamari Wali Good News as the parallel lead, Navya Agnihotri.

Filmography

Films

Television

Music videos

References

External links
 

21st-century Indian actresses
Living people
Indian television actresses
1996 births
Indian soap opera actresses
Female models from Madhya Pradesh
Actresses from Bhopal